William Booth or Bothe (–1464) was Bishop of Coventry and Lichfield from 1447 before becoming Archbishop of York in 1452 until his death in 1464.

Life
Prior to his election as Bishop of Coventry and Lichfield, Booth had served as Rector of Prescot, Lancashire from 1441. He was provided to the see of Coventry and Lichfield on 26 April 1447 and  consecrated on 9 July 1447.

Booth was translated to the archdiocese of York on 21 July 1452. In the late summer of 1463, allied with the Neville brothers Richard, Earl of Warwick and John, Marquess of Montagu, Archbishop Booth led an army in the north of England which repelled an attempted invasion by the Scots and former King Henry VI with Margaret of Anjou.

Booth died the following year, on 12 September 1464, at Bishopthorpe Palace and is buried in a family vault at Southwell Minster.

See also
 Archbishop Lawrence Booth (half-brother)
 Booth baronets

Citations

References

Further reading
 Burke's Peerage & Baronetage
 

1380s births
1464 deaths
Clergy from Lancashire
Archbishops of York
Bishops of Lichfield
15th-century English Roman Catholic archbishops
People from Eccles, Greater Manchester